Speake may refer to:

Speake, Alabama, an unincorporated community in Lawrence County, Alabama, United States

People with the surname
Bob Speake (born 1930), American baseball player
George Speake, English historian
Jennifer Speake (born 1944), reference book editor

See also
Speke (disambiguation)